Mesnil-Mauger is a commune in the Seine-Maritime department in the Normandy region in northern France.

Geography

Population

Places of interest
 The church of St.Maur in the hamlet of Trefforest, dating from the eleventh century.
 The church of Notre-Dame, also dating from the eleventh century.

See also
Communes of the Seine-Maritime department

References

Communes of Seine-Maritime